Major-General Simon James Pack  is a retired Royal Marines officer.

Military career
Educated at Fernden Preparatory School in Surrey and Hurstpierpoint College, Pack was commissioned into the Royal Marines in 1962. As a junior officer he was deployed to Sarawak during the Indonesia–Malaysia confrontation. After serving in Northern Ireland during The Troubles, he became Commanding Officer of 45 Commando in 1987, Director Commitments (Overseas) in 1990 during the Gulf War and Commander British Forces Gibraltar in 1994.

Since his retirement from the Royal Marines in 1997, Pack has been International Teams Director of the England and Wales Cricket Board and Partnership Secretary of Gill Jennings & Every, a law firm.

References

Royal Marines generals
Companions of the Order of the Bath
Commanders of the Order of the British Empire
People educated at Hurstpierpoint College
Living people
Year of birth missing (living people)